The Unspeakable (Polish: O czym się nie mówi, also O czem się nie mówi) is a 1924 Polish lost silent drama film directed by Edward Puchalski, starring Jadwiga Smosarska and Wanda Siemaszkowa. It was remade in 1939.

The film's sets were designed by the art directors Józef Galewski and Mieczysław Krawicz.

Plot 
Krajewski, a banking clerk, falls in love with Frania, a girl he met accidentally. Frania returns the favor, but it turns out that she is so impoverished that she works as a prostitute. She's completely dependent on her pimp, Kosz, and his partner in crime, Prysadna. The next day Krajewski meets Kosz, who treats him as a client and offers him to find and deliver a woman that Krajewski is looking for. Krajewski describes Frania, who is brought to him. Krajewski then offers Frania the prospect of a life together.

Cast
 Jadwiga Smosarska as Frania Watorek 'Poranek' 
 Kazimierz Justian as clerk Krajewski 'Tatuńcio' 
 Wanda Siemaszkowa as Romanowa 
 Władysław Grabowski as Konitz 
 Stefan Jaracz as counselor Wolski 
 Maria Gorczyńska as Mańka 
 Wieslaw Gawlikowski as pimp Kosz 
 Maria Chaveau as Prysadna 
 Ludwik Fritsche as Ten, co płaci 
 Maria Dulęba as Gwozdecka 
 Maria Balcerkiewiczówna as "one of them"
 Justyna Czartorzyska
 Józef Węgrzyn
 Mira Zimińska
 Tadeusz Olsza
 Jan Szymanski
 Wlodzimierz Macherski

References

Bibliography
 Skaff, Sheila. The Law of the Looking Glass: Cinema in Poland, 1896-1939. Ohio University Press, 2008.

External links

O czem się nie mówi on filmpolski.pl

1924 films
1924 drama films
Polish drama films
Films directed by Edward Puchalski
Polish silent films
1920s Polish-language films
Polish black-and-white films
Lost Polish films
Silent drama films